Pentti August Pekkarinen (20 September 1917 in Maaninka – 20 January 1975) was a Finnish farmer and politician. He served as Deputy Minister of Social Affairs from 4 September 1972 until his death on 20 January 1975. He was a member of the Parliament of Finland from 1958 until his death in 1975, representing the Agrarian League (which changed its name to Centre Party in 1965).

References

1917 births
1975 deaths
People from Maaninka
Centre Party (Finland) politicians
Ministers of Social Affairs of Finland
Members of the Parliament of Finland (1958–62)
Members of the Parliament of Finland (1962–66)
Members of the Parliament of Finland (1966–70)
Members of the Parliament of Finland (1970–72)
Members of the Parliament of Finland (1972–75)